Antonin Rouzier (born 18 August 1986) is a French professional volleyball player, a former member of the France national team. A participant in the Olympic Games Rio 2016, 2015 European Champion and the 2015 World League winner.

Personal life
Rouzier was born in Saint-Martin-d'Hères, France. On July 27, 2014, Antonin married to Lili. In May 2016 his wife gave birth to their son Louis.

Career
In 2011–2013 Rouzier played for the Polish club ZAKSA Kędzierzyn-Koźle. He won bronze (2011/2012) and silver (2012/2013) of Polish Championship, Polish Cup 2013. In season 2013/2014 moved to Bre Banca Lannutti Cuneo. After financial problems of the Italian club decided to leave team from Cuneo. In June 2014 moved to Turkish Ziraat Bankası Ankara. On October 18, 2015 French national team, including Rouzier, achieved title of the European Champion 2015 (3–0 with Slovenia in the finale). He received individual award for the Most Valuable Player of the championships.

In May 2017 he signed one-year contract with Russian club Yenisey Krasnoyarsk.

Honours

Clubs
 National championships
 2008/2009  Belgian Championship, with Knack Roeselare
 2010/2011  French Championship, with Stade Poitevin Poitiers
 2012/2013  Polish Cup, with ZAKSA Kędzierzyn-Koźle
 2012/2013  Polish Championship, with ZAKSA Kędzierzyn-Koźle

Individual awards
 2009: CEV European Championship – Best Scorer
 2011: French Championship – Best Opposite
 2013: CEV Champions League – Best Spiker
 2015: CEV European Championship – Most Valuable Player
 2016: FIVB World League – Best Outside Spiker

References

External links

 
 Player profile at LegaVolley.it 
 Player profile at PlusLiga.pl 
 
 
 Player profile at Volleybox.net 

1986 births
Living people
Sportspeople from Isère
French men's volleyball players
Olympic volleyball players of France
Volleyball players at the 2016 Summer Olympics
French expatriate sportspeople in Belgium
Expatriate volleyball players in Belgium
French expatriate sportspeople in Poland
Expatriate volleyball players in Poland
French expatriate sportspeople in Italy
Expatriate volleyball players in Italy
French expatriate sportspeople in Turkey
Expatriate volleyball players in Turkey
French expatriate sportspeople in Russia
Expatriate volleyball players in Russia
French expatriate sportspeople in Japan
Expatriate volleyball players in Japan
French expatriate sportspeople in Qatar
Expatriate volleyball players in Qatar
ZAKSA Kędzierzyn-Koźle players
Opposite hitters